Marshall Lake is a small alpine lake in Custer County, Idaho, United States, located in the Sawtooth Mountains in the Sawtooth National Recreation Area.  Sawtooth National Forest trail 528 (Alpine Way trail) leads directly to Marshall Lake.  The lakes is most easily accessed from the Redfish Lake or Stanley Ranger Station trailheads.

Marshall Lake is in the Sawtooth Wilderness, and a wilderness permit can be obtained at a registration box at trailheads or wilderness boundaries.  The lakes sits just to the east of Williams and Merritt Peaks.

References

See also
 List of lakes of the Sawtooth Mountains (Idaho)
 Sawtooth National Forest
 Sawtooth National Recreation Area
 Sawtooth Range (Idaho)

Lakes of Idaho
Lakes of Custer County, Idaho
Glacial lakes of the United States
Glacial lakes of the Sawtooth Wilderness